The Boulogne–Calais railway is an electrified double track railway running between the ports of Boulogne-sur-Mer and Calais in France. An extension of the Longueau–Boulogne railway it meets the Lille–Fontinettes railway and Coudekerque-Branche–Fontinettes railway to Dunkirk at Les Fontinettes station in Calais.

The line opened on 7 January 1867 with railway stations at Wimille, Marquise, Caffiers and St Pierre. It was used only for local traffic between Boulogne and Calais until that March when the Paris to Calais trains were diverted, cutting 30 minutes off the Paris to London mail route.

Until the start of the Eurostar service from London to Paris in 1994 via LGV Nord it was the main route for the boat trains to Paris which met the ships carrying passengers from Great Britain.  the line is used by TGV services from Rang-du-Fliers via Calais-Fréthun to Lille-Europe and local TER Hauts-de-France services.

References

Railway lines in Hauts-de-France
Standard gauge railways in France
Railway lines opened in 1867